is a series of social simulation bishōjo games where the player must act as a parental figure and raise a young girl. The series was produced by the video game and anime production company Gainax. The first Princess Maker, while popular enough to be translated into Chinese, was never released in the United States. Princess Maker 2 was translated by SoftEgg for a North American release, but this release was cancelled because publisher Intracorp went bankrupt.  Princess Maker 3, Princess Maker 4, and Princess Maker 5 have subsequently been released, as did several spin-off games. The series has been translated and released in Korea (Fujitsu) and Taiwan (Kingformation). An English release of Princess Maker 2 was attempted in mid-90s, but it resulted in failure, and no games in this series were released in English until Princess Maker 2 Refine in 2016. Petite Princess Yucie, an anime series loosely based on the third game but with characters from all previous games, ran for 26 episodes in 2002–2003.

Main series

Princess Maker 
The first of the Princess Maker games was a popular MicroCabin game at the time of its release in 1991. It was re-released in a 'Refine Edition' with enhanced graphics and voices. There is a fan-made English and Spanish translation for the normal MSX version. The original version is for the NEC PC-9801 system, and the Refine Edition is out for the PlayStation 2 as well as Windows.

The player is in charge of a war orphan, Maria, after defeating an evil demon. This game is similar to Princess Maker 2, but one cannot give pocket money to the daughter, and in this version, the player can send the daughter to town to view the people's opinions of her. The wardrobe is also much larger than the sequel. There are four sets of clothing for each season. These clothes change after aging. Therefore, there are about 28 sets of clothing the daughter can wear over the years. The Harvest Festival has a Combat Tournament and a Miss Kingdom Contest. If the daughter succeeds, her popularity will rise. There are 74 possible endings, ranging from humble jobs such as a soldier or a mason, to prestigious jobs such as Archbishop or Prime Minister, to "dark side" jobs such as prostitute or crime lord. In addition, numerous factors decide whether or not the daughter is successful at her job, whom she marries, and whether she has children of her own.

Famitsu magazine's Reader Cross Review gave the PC Engine version of the game an 8 out of 10.

Princess Maker 2

The second game in the series, Princess Maker 2, was released in 1993.

Princess Maker 3: Fairy Tales Come True
Released in 1997, this game was originally unnumbered and called Princess Maker: Faery Tales Come True. It was released for the PlayStation, Windows, Dreamcast (as a collection with Princess Maker 2) and Sega Saturn. In 2019, the HD remake of the game was released on Nintendo Switch and PC.

In Princess Maker 3, the daughter is a young faery who desires to become a human princess. The player's task is to help her reach adulthood. In this version, everything said to your daughter and done will help determine your daughter's attitude, social status, and outlook on life. Unlike the previous game, the player has a chance to choose between six occupations. The occupation determines the player's social status in the kingdom, cash at hand, and the amount of yearly wage. The occupation will also affect various factors in the main character, starting with the attitude with which she begins. Along these lines, unlike the previous games where she was either happy, sick, or rebellious, the daughter's attitude can range from happy, to average, to worried, to spoiled. Her attitude will be determined based on both the player's job starting off (Merchant, Performer, Fallen Nobleman, Priest, Retired Knight, and Bard) and how well is she treated by the player during the game. There are 60 endings in this game ranging from the typical ones like General and Hero, to some more distinctive like Gambler and Freelancer. There are also many "magical" endings, with not only the princess ending, but princess of darkness, cats, etc. She can also marry a variety of people.

The player's daughter has a number of courses and jobs available, just like in Princess Maker 2. The courses to enhance her status include regular school, ballet class or church. All courses, save for church and fasting sessions, will challenge the daughter with a test/exam based on her status and how long she has dedicated herself to the course. The result of the test/exam will be directly proportional to the daughter's status. Once the result is announced, her reaction will depend on her overall status. The daughter's reactions vary, and it may or may not have effect on status for better or for worse. For all courses with test/exam, the daughter will have an opportunity to encounter her "rival" depending on your status related to the course. All courses, save for church and fasting sessions, will offer a unique rival female character. If the status related to the course is high enough, the rival may offer her friendship. Once the friendship is forged, the rival character will bring present on the character's birthday that would boost up some of her status depending on what kind of gift it is. They also would occasionally visit your daughter and hang out, which reduces her stress level and boosts certain personality status. School course is rather unusual as she may get a scholarship offer depending on her academic status.

Princess Maker 4
Unlike past installments, Princess Maker 4 was developed by GeneX, although Takami Akai (original series creator) remained on hand as a supervisor. This time, character illustrations were handled by Tenhiro Naoto, the creator of Sister Princess. It was released in 2005 on the PlayStation 2.

Structurally, Princess Maker 4 draws much inspiration from Princess Maker 2, although an adventure mode does not exist anymore. As with PM3, full voiceovers have been recorded, including contributions from famous voice actors like Sakurai Takahiro (Prince Sharul/Charles). PM4 is highly drama-oriented. Throughout the game, there are various event scenes that offer clues about your daughter's past, not to mention the war between humans and non-humans and her demonic roots. This is probably what differentiates it the most from previous PM games. Another change is that most of the vice-related jobs are less "adult-oriented" as it is impossible for the daughter to receive more sinful jobs such as Cabaret Dancing or as an assassin.

The story begins when the player, a soldier, falls in love with a mysterious woman. However, she disappears, only to be found by him a few years later. She hands him the child, whose default name is Patricia, along with Cube the butler, and so his quest to fatherhood begins.

A Japanese PC version of Princess Maker 4 was released on July 28, 2006. It contains many more endings and events compared to the original. A PlayStation Portable version of Princess Maker 4 was released in Japan on October 12, 2006. A Nintendo DS version of it was released with a few more endings and "extras" not released in the PC version. These extras are, like ending galleries, only accessible after finishing the first ending and credit sequence.

Earlier, there was an entirely different Princess Maker 4 in the works. Under development at Ninelives, the game was to take place in modern Tokyo rather than the medieval world featured in the final game. This project was eventually abandoned due to Akai's health issues. However, the concept went on to be the basis of Princess Maker 5, including the modern Japan setting and the fact that Cube can transform himself into a dog.

Princess Maker 5

Princess Maker 5 released for Windows in 2007.

Princess Maker: Legend of Another World
This 1995 game shares many similarities with Princess Maker 2 and was released for the Super NES by Takara. Unlike the other games, the daughter does not have a default name, but is named Melody Blue in Go! Go! Princess.

Related games 
 Princess Maker Pocket Daisakusen, a puzzle game using Princess Maker characters.
 Princess Maker Go! Go! Princess, a board game using Princess Maker characters.
 Princess Maker Q, a quiz adventure game using Princess Maker characters.
 Princess Maker Social, an online version of Princess Maker developed by MGAME Korea.
 Princess Maker for KAKAO, a mobile app version of Princess Maker featuring previous characters and clothes.

Anime 

The anime Petite Princess Yucie is loosely based on all the Princess Maker games, has the character of Cube from Princess Maker 2 appearing as Yucie's steward in the anime, looking nearly identical in style and design to how he appears in the game. Yucie herself looks almost identical to the character of Lisa from Princess Maker 3, including the hairstyle and unusually large forehead. The final "villain" of the anime shares the appearance of Maria, the daughter from Princess Maker 1. Ket Shi the demon cat, a minor villain in one episode, is also from Princess Maker 2, although in the game he is the god of the Wildcat tribe, and can be helpful to the player rather than harmful. Other characters in Petite Princess Yucie can undoubtedly also be found in other Princess Maker games.

See also
 Angelique
 Cute Knight
 Long Live the Queen

References

External links
 Princess Maker series at MobyGames
 Nuriko's Princess Maker Nexus
 Kit Kat's Princess Maker Corner
 Story of the failed translation
 PM refine edition page
 Kingformation PMQ page
 Princess Maker history

1991 video games
1997 video games
2006 video games
Bishōjo games
Fantasy video games
Gainax
MSX2 games
NEC PC-9801 games
Nintendo DS games
Nintendo Switch games
PlayStation (console) games
PlayStation 2 games
PlayStation Portable games
Raising sims
Sega Saturn games
X68000 games
Takara video games
TurboGrafx-CD games
Video game franchises
Video game franchises introduced in 1991
Video games developed in Japan
Video games featuring female protagonists
Video games featuring non-playable protagonists
Windows games